Racinaea tetrantha is a plant species in the genus Racinaea. This species is native to Bolivia, Costa Rica, Venezuela and Ecuador.

References

tetrantha
Flora of Bolivia
Flora of Costa Rica
Flora of Venezuela
Flora of Ecuador